The most recent elections for the Coimbatore Municipal Corporation were held in February 2022. The candidates campaigned for 100 wards in the  election. Election results were declared in February 2022.

Election results
In the 2022 Tamil Nadu urban local body elections, DMK and its allies in the Secular Progressive Alliance, won 96 wards out of total 100 wards for Coimbatore Municipal Corporation. The DMK won 76 and its allies 20. Among the allies of DMK, Congress won nine, CPI(M) and CPI - four each, and MDMK three wards. The incumbent ruling party in the Coimbtore corporation council, AIADMK won three seats. Social Democratic Party of India won 1 ward.

References

Coimbatore
Local elections in Tamil Nadu
2020s in Tamil Nadu
2022 elections in India
Government of Coimbatore